Alfred Edward Taggart (19 August 1907 – 11 July 1983) was an Australian rules footballer who played for the Fitzroy Football Club in the Victorian Football League (VFL).

Taggart later served in the Royal Australian Air Force during World War II.

Notes

External links 
		

1907 births
1983 deaths
Australian rules footballers from Victoria (Australia)
Fitzroy Football Club players